The Canadian Journal of Criminology and Criminal Justice is a quarterly peer-reviewed academic journal covering the theoretical and scientific aspects of the study of crime and the practical problems of law enforcement, administration of justice and the treatment of offenders, particularly in the Canadian context. It is published by the University of Toronto Press.

Abstracting and indexing
The journal is abstracted and indexed in:
 Academic Search Alumni Edition
 Academic Search Complete
 Academic Search Elite
 Academic Search Premier
 Academic Search Ultimate
 Advanced Placement Source
 Applied Social Sciences Index and Abstracts
 Book Review Digest Plus
 Business Source Corporate
 Business Source Corporate Plus
 Canadian Reference Centre
 China Education Publications Import & Export Corporation (CEPIEC)
 Criminal Justice Abstracts
 Criminal Justice Abstracts with Full Text
 Criminal Justice Periodical Index
 CrossRef
 Current Contents
 Current Contents—Social and Behavioral Sciences
 Current Law Index
 EJS EBSCO Electronic Journals Service
 Expanded Academic Index
 Google Scholar
 Index to Canadian Legal Literature
 Index to Periodical Articles Related to Law
 International Security & Counter-Terrorism Reference Center (ISCTRC)
 JCR: Social Science Edition
 Legal Collection
 Legal Source
 MasterFILE Complete
 MasterFILE Elite
 MasterFILE Premier
 Microsoft Academic Search
 OmniFile Full Text Mega
 Project MUSE
 Psychological Abstracts
 Psychology & Behavioral Sciences Collection
 Scopus
 Social Sciences Abstracts
 Social Sciences Citation Index
 Social Sciences Full Text
 Social Science Source
 Social Work Abstracts
 SocINDEX
 SocINDEX with Full Text
 SocINFO
 Sociology Source Ultimate
 Violence and Abuse Abstracts
 Web of Science

References

External links

University of Toronto Press academic journals
Quarterly journals
Publications established in 1958
English-language journals
Criminology journals